Cephrenes acalle, commonly known as the plain palm dart, is a butterfly belonging to the family Hesperiidae. An examination of the type specimen showed that it was identical to Cephrenes chrysozona lompa Evans 1934 based on genitalia. This has led to Cephrenes chrysozona being treated as a synonym. The species breeds on palms including coconut, Calamus, Elaeis, Roystonea and Prychosperma.

Subspecies
There are seven subspecies within the distribution range that extends from India through Indo-China into the Philippines.
Cephrenes acalle acalle
Cephrenes acalle oceanica (Mabille, 1904) (India, Papua)
Cephrenes acalle kayapu (Doherty, 1891) (Engano)
Cephrenes acalle nicobarica Evans, 1932 (Nicobars)
Cephrenes acalle chrysozona (Plötz, 1883) (Type locality: Philippines)
Cephrenes acalle kliana Evans, 1934 (Borneo)
Cephrenes acalle niasicus Plotz, 1886

References

Taractrocerini
Fauna of Pakistan
Butterflies of Asia
Butterflies described in 1874